Hamzian-e Sofla (also Romanized as Ḩamzīān-e Soflá and Ḩamzīān Soflá; also known as Ḩamzīān, Ḩamzīān-e Pā”īn, Hamzīyān, and Khamziān) is a village in Churs Rural District, in the Central District of Chaypareh County, West Azerbaijan Province, Iran. At the 2006 census, its population was 65, in 15 families.

References 

Populated places in Chaypareh County